WEZR (780 kHz) is an AM radio station in Rumford, Maine. The station is owned by Stan Bennett, through licensee Bennett Radio Group. The station airs a conservative talk radio format. As a sports station, it was the home of the Portland Pirates American League hockey, and Portland Sea Dogs Eastern League baseball. On weekday mornings and middays, some Christian talk and teaching programs were also heard.

The station was assigned the WTME call letters by the Federal Communications Commission on July 11, 2001.

WTME's programming was previously simulcast with WCNM (1240 AM) in Lewiston and WKTQ (1450 AM) in South Paris. WCNM switched to CNN Headline News in July 2001 and is now hot adult contemporary station WIGY, while WKTQ became country music station WOXO in August 2016 and is now WPNO, a simulcast of WEZR.

On March 8, 2017, WTME changed its format to sports, with programming from NBC Sports Radio.

WTME, along with its sister stations, went off the air March 29, 2020, citing financial considerations that included expected reduction in advertising revenue attributed to COVID-19. The stations had been up for sale following the death of owner Dick Gleason in February 2019. A sale of the Gleason Media Group stations to Bennett Radio Group was announced in May 2020, and was consummated on August 5, 2020, at a sale price of $500,000.

On August 9, 2020, WTME changed its call letters to WIGY, and returned to the air on August 19, 2020, as Hot AC "WIGY", which it returned to simulcasting WEZR (the former WCNM) and WPNO (the former WKTQ) in the process. It changed its callsign to the current WEZR on September 7, 2020. However, in 2021, the format later shifted to classic hits, as "105.5 & 96.9 WIGY".

On October 26, 2021, WEZR and W252DS, along with WPNO and its translator, split from the simulcast with WIGY and flipped to conservative talk, branded as "The Patriot".

References

External links

EZR (AM)
Radio stations established in 1953
1953 establishments in Maine
Rumford, Maine
Conservative talk radio
Talk radio stations in the United States